Bay View, previously known as Kai-arero and Petane, is a settlement in the Hawke's Bay region of the eastern North Island of New Zealand. It lies on State Highway 2, nine kilometres north of the city centre of Napier. The Esk River flows into the sea just to the north. Hawke's Bay Airport and the Napier suburb of Westshore lie just to the south. Bay View has been administered by the Napier City Council since the 1989 local government reforms.

History
In 1826, the rangatira Tuakiaki ate the tongue of his brother-in-law Te Mautaranui of Tuhoe, whom he had killed in revenge for an earlier murder, at Bay View. In memory of this event, the location was named Kai-arero ("eating of the tongue").

William Colenso of the Church Missionary Society established a mission outstation named Bethany here. Māori transliterated Bethany as Pētane and this became the name of the area. Pētane was seized by Maori in the early 1860s with the idea of attacking Napier. The name of the area was changed to Bay View in 1924 to avoid confusion with Petone in the Wellington region.

Demographics

Bay View had a population of 2,238 at the 2018 New Zealand census, an increase of 318 people (16.6%) since the 2013 census, and an increase of 465 people (26.2%) since the 2006 census. There were 762 households, comprising 1,122 males and 1,119 females, giving a sex ratio of 1.0 males per female. The median age was 46.0 years (compared with 37.4 years nationally), with 444 people (19.8%) aged under 15 years, 294 (13.1%) aged 15 to 29, 1,122 (50.1%) aged 30 to 64, and 381 (17.0%) aged 65 or older.

Ethnicities were 90.8% European/Pākehā, 17.0% Māori, 0.9% Pacific peoples, 2.3% Asian, and 1.5% other ethnicities. People may identify with more than one ethnicity.

The percentage of people born overseas was 13.1, compared with 27.1% nationally.

Although some people chose not to answer the census's question about religious affiliation, 60.6% had no religion, 30.2% were Christian, 1.2% had Māori religious beliefs, 0.3% were Hindu, 0.3% were Buddhist and 1.6% had other religions.

Of those at least 15 years old, 324 (18.1%) people had a bachelor's or higher degree, and 300 (16.7%) people had no formal qualifications. The median income was $36,500, compared with $31,800 nationally. 360 people (20.1%) earned over $70,000 compared to 17.2% nationally. The employment status of those at least 15 was that 939 (52.3%) people were employed full-time, 294 (16.4%) were part-time, and 33 (1.8%) were unemployed.

References

Napier, New Zealand
Beaches of the Hawke's Bay Region
Suburbs of Napier, New Zealand
Populated places in the Hawke's Bay Region
Populated places around Hawke Bay